Interactive Futures (IF) was a biennial conference and exhibition, hosted in Vancouver, British Columbia, Canada, that explored current tendencies, research and dialogue related to the intersection of technology and art. Interactive Futures included a variety of events such as lectures, workshops, exhibitions, and panels in an effort to provide opportunities for discourse by local, national and international researchers and practitioners.

History
Interactive Futures (IF) has been active since 2002 holding a conference alongside its exhibitions and performances. From 2002 through 2007, Interactive Futures has grown from a single venue event, held at the University of Victoria that featured local researchers and artists, to a multi-venue event with international cultural partners, an active archival website and international publications.

Interactive Futures 2006

IF'06: Audio Visions focused on exploring new forms of audio-based multimedia art, music theatre, performance, and installation.
The event was held in joint collaboration with the Digital Art Weeks  founded by Art Clay and Juerg Gutknecht on the Institute of Computer Systems of ETH Zurich, Switzerland

Interactive Futures 2004

IF'04: New Media Crossing Boundaries, included exhibition work from Canadian artists Julie Andreyev, Jean Piché, Kenneth Newby and Aleksandra Dulic along with international artist, and experimental electronic musician DJ Spooky.

References

External links
 Interactive Futures Homepage 
 Interactive Futures Facebook

Visual arts conferences
Technology conferences
Academic conferences
Contemporary art organizations
Interactive art
New media
Culture of Vancouver
2002 establishments in British Columbia
Recurring events established in 2002